is a temple complex in Kyoto, Japan, and head temple of the associated branch of Rinzai Zen Buddhism. The Myōshin-ji school is by far the largest school in Rinzai Zen, approximately as big as the other thirteen branches combined: it contains within it about 3,400 temples throughout Japan, together with a handful overseas, of the approximately six thousand total Rinzai temples, and also has nineteen associated monasteries, of the total of forty monasteries and one nunnery.

History

The grounds of the temple were formally a palace for the Emperor Hanazono. Hanazono abdicated in 1318 and took the tonsure (became a monk) in 1335, and in 1342 donated the palace to found the temple; the district and many places in the area are named "Hanazono" in his honor. The head temple was founded in 1342 by the Zen master Kanzan Egen (関山慧玄, 1277–1360), third patriarch in the influential Ōtōkan lineage.

Nearly all of the buildings were destroyed in the Ōnin War in 1467. However, many of them have been rebuilt, initially under the leadership of Sekko-Soshin Zenji (1408–1486), the sixth patriarch. The present buildings were primarily built during the following 150 years (late 15th through early 17th century), and today the gardens of Myōshin-ji are a nationally designated Place of Scenic Beauty and Historic Site.

The temple's bell, known as Okikicho, is the oldest-known example of a Buddhist bonshō ("temple bell") in Japan, as well as being  the oldest bell in the world still in use. It was cast in 698.

School 
A difference between this and other schools of Rinzai Zen is that the Myōshin-ji school  does not necessarily follow the set of established kōan for the sake of testing one's stage of enlightenment. Rather the Myōshin-ji school allows the master to specifically tailor kōan to a student's needs and background. This method diverges from the traditionally accepted canon of kōan.

Layout

The complex is quite sprawling, and features a number of winding paths flanked by high walls, so it is easy to become disoriented. As is usual in Japanese temple construction, the main buildings are located on the axis from the south gate, in the south-west quadrant of the complex. There is a main north–south path connecting the north gate and the south gate, starting parallel to the main buildings, then continuing north, flanked by veering slight, and ending at the north gate. There is also an east–west path leading east from the main buildings (starting in the west at Tenju-in, passing between the hattō and butsuden, then ending in the east, after a curve, at Tōrin-in). In addition to the direct north–south path, there is a longer path that proceeds east from the north gate, winds past Keishun-in, then terminates in the east–west just south of Daishin-in. In addition to these main routes, there are a number of side paths. These paths are all lined with sub-temples, generally with a single entrance.

Buildings
 Important Cultural Property of Japan
 Chokushimon - Built in 1610.
 Sanmon - Built in 1599.
 Butsuden - Built in 1827.
 Hattō - Built in 1656.
 Dai-hōjō - Built in 1654.
 Kuri - Built in 1653.
 Sho-hōjō - Built in 1603.
 Yokushitsu - Built in 1656.
 Kyōzō - Built in 1673.
 Minamimon - Built in 1610.
 Kitamon - Built in 1610.
 Genkan - Built in 1654.
 Shindō - Built in 1656.

Access
There are two main gates: one to the south, and one to north; there are also side entrances that do not pass through a gate. Just inside both the north and south gates are small information booths, providing maps and directions.

A number of train stations are located nearby:
 Myōshin-ji station and Ryōan-ji station on the Randen line, near north gate
 Hanazono Station on the JR Sagano Line, near the south gate

Sub-temples
There are 40-odd  of the main temple (Myōshin-ji states 46, but lists 49), of which 30-odd are within the grounds of the main complex, and 10 are in the surrounding area. These include:

Within the grounds
Open year-round
  – most noted sub-temple, garden and ink paintings
  – connections with Christianity and with Buddhist philosophy, meditation in English
  – rock garden , shukubō
  – tea garden (matcha tea served)
Seasonal openings
 Tōrin-in – seasonal openings (parts of January, July, and October), year-round shukubō and shōjin-ryōri
 Daihō-in 大法院 – spring and autumn openings (new leaves and autumn leaves: early April through early May, and November, respectively)
Limited admission (conditions apply)
 Daiyū-in 大雄院
Closed to public
(Others)

Off the grounds
Open to the public
 Ryōan-ji – short walk away, world-famous rock garden, UNESCO World Heritage Site
Limited admission
 Eshō-in 慧照院 – just south of main grounds, limited admission; seasonal opening for camellia garden in late April
 Seigen-in 西源院 – just south of Ryōan-ji, limited admission
Closed to the public
(Others)

Affiliated temples
Temples in the Myōshin-ji school, but not sub-temples the main complex include:
 Enshō-ji (Nara)
 Sōken-ji
 Zuiryū-ji (Gifu)

School 
Hanazono University, the Rinzai university, was established by Myōshin-ji in 1872, and is located some distance to the southeast of the temple complex. In the southeast corner of the square plot of the temple complex proper is the associated Hanazono High School, just across a small river.

Abbots 
Abbots have included:
 Kanzan Egen 關山慧玄 (1277–1360), founder and first abbot
 ? ... ?
 Gudō Toshoku (1577–1661), thrice abbot
 ? ... ?
 Goto Zuigan (1879–1965)

See also 
 List of National Treasures of Japan (crafts-others)
 List of National Treasures of Japan (writings)
 Ichibata Yakushi Kyodan
 For an explanation of terms concerning Japanese Buddhism, Japanese Buddhist art, and Japanese Buddhist temple architecture, see the Glossary of Japanese Buddhism.

References

Bibliography
 "Japanese Rinzai Zen Buddhism. Myoshinji, a living religion" Jørn Borup, Brill, 
 "Gardens For All: Myoshinji: Zen gardens wondrous to behold, and not", The Japan Times, March 28, 2002, by Gerard Taaffe
 Buswell, Robert Jr; Lopez, Donald S. Jr., eds. (2013). Princeton Dictionary of Buddhism. Princeton, NJ: Princeton University Press, p. 559. .

External links 

 Myōshin-ji Official site (includes English section)
 Head Temples of Zen Buddhism

1342 establishments in Asia
 
Places of Scenic Beauty
Buddhist temples in Kyoto
Historic Sites of Japan
Important Cultural Properties of Japan
1340s establishments in Japan
Zen gardens